Lunatica is a Swiss symphonic metal band, formed in Suhr in 1998.

Biography

Formation
Founded by keyboardist Alex Seiberl and guitarist Sandro D'Incau, lead vocalist Andrea Dätwyler joined the band in 2001.

Atlantis
Their debut album Atlantis was released later that year. A series of concerts and festival appearances followed, and Lunatica was named "Best Newcomers" at the Swiss metal festival, Metaldayz.

Fables & Dreams
Their second album Fables & Dreams followed in February 2004, produced by Sascha Paeth, renowned for his work with numerous successful European acts. Fables & Dreams debuted at #13 on the Swiss Internet Charts.

The Edge of Infinity
Their third album The Edge of Infinity followed in August 2006.

In 2008, guitarist André Leuenberger left the band, and was replaced by Marc Torretti.

New Shores and Hiatus
Most recently, Lunatica's fourth album New Shores was released in February 2009.

Return and untitled fifth album
An as-yet untitled fifth album has been in production since 2010.

On March 14, 2019, the band shared a pre-production version of the upcoming song Luna on their Soundcloud site.

Line-up

Current members

Sandro D’Incau - guitars (1998–present)
Alex Seiberl - keyboards (1998–present)
Andrea Dätwyler - vocals (2001–present)
Emilio "MG" Barrantes - bass (2001–present)
Ronnie Wolf - drums (2001–present)

Previous members
Beat Brack - bass (1998–2001)
Ermes Di Prisco - drums (1998–2001)
André Leuenberger - guitars (2001–2008)
Marc Torretti - guitars (2008-2009)
Zoltan Daraban - guitars (2009-2012)

Timeline

Discography

Full-length albums
Atlantis (2001, Frontiers Records)
Fables & Dreams (2004, Frontiers Records)
The Edge of Infinity (2006, Frontiers Records)
New Shores (2009, Napalm Records)

Singles
Fable of Dreams (2004)
Who You Are (2005)

Music videos
Song for You (2007)

References

External links
Facebook page
Soundcloud page
Bandcamp page

Swiss symphonic metal musical groups
Musical groups established in 1998
Musical quintets
Napalm Records artists